Auðunn Blöndal (born 8 July 1980) is an Icelandic television personality, actor and comedian. He is best known as the co-host of the comedy shows 70 mínútur and Strákarnir, and as the host of Tekinn, the Icelandic version of Ashton Kutcher's show Punk'd. He also starred in the comedy series Svínasúpan, and in the Icelandic production of Richard Herring's, known as Typpatal in Icelandic.

Filmography
The Big Rescue (2009) – Bully
The Magic Wardrobe (2011)
Víti í Vestmannaeyjum (2018)
Gullregn (2020) – Orri
Cop Secret (2021) – Bússi

References

External links
 

1980 births
Icelandic television personalities
Auðunn Blöndal
Auðunn Blöndal
Auðunn Blöndal
Auðunn Blöndal
Living people